Henry Lincoln (died 1397), of Canterbury, Kent, was an English politician.

Family
Lincoln was the son of Robert Lincoln of Canterbury, also an MP. Henry married, before 1381, a woman named Isabel, and they had three sons.

Career
Lincoln was a Member of Parliament for Canterbury constituency in October 1382, February 1383, 1385 and January 1390.

References

People from Canterbury
Year of birth missing
14th-century births
1397 deaths
English MPs October 1382
English MPs February 1383
English MPs 1385
English MPs January 1390